Boris Miljković (Serbian-Cyrillic: Борис Миљковић; born 3 April 1956 in Zagreb, PR Croatia, FPR Yugoslavia) is a Serbian film director, screenwriter, creative director in advertising and writer.

Biography
Boris Miljković  studied Film directing at the Department of Film and TV Directing of the Faculty of Dramatic Arts of Belgrade's University of Arts and graduated with diploma. Together with Branimir Dimitrijević, he became part of the creative duo Boris & Tucko and was co-author and co-director of numerous TV shows and films during the eighties, including Niko kao ja (Nobody Likes Me; children's TV series, 1981), Rokenroler (Rock'n'Roller; 1980), Ruski umetnički eksperiment (The Russian Artistic Experiment; 1982) and Šumanović - Komedija umetnika (Šumanović - Comedy of an Artist; 1987). A section of his contemporary video work was introduced at exhibitions of the Museum of Modern Art (MoMA) and the Contemporary Arts Museum Houston in 1989.

In the nineties, he worked as creative director in advertising for Saatchi and Saatchi Cairo and McCann Erickson Belgrade in cooperation with Srđan Šaper. The artist was creator of video impressions of the performance Silence of the Balkans which was the final event of Thessaloniki – European Capital of Culture 1997. In recent decades, he has created several hundred television advertisements, music videos and theater trailers. The film artist is also author of printed literature which is mostly edited by the publishing house Geopoetika. Miljkovic is laureate of renowned prizes such as JRT Award (1983), Prize of Monte Carlo Television Festival (1983), Clio Award (1988), MTV Award (1989), the Isidora Sekulić Award 2002 for his prose Tea Time in Zamalek, the UEPS Award 2007 and the Golden Maple Award (category tourism film) of Jahorina Film Festival 2016.

In 2003, he directed Slobodan Šnajder’s Nevjesta od vjetra (The Bride of the Wind) at National Theatre Belgrade and Stravinsky's Prica o vojniku (The Soldier's Tale) at Atelje 212 Theatre two years later. He was appointed artistic director for the conceptual realization of the Eurovision Song Contest 2008. In 2017, he was one of the initiators of the Serbian MTS Vision Festival. Miljković has been creative director at Radio Television of Serbia (RTS) for many years.

Bibliography (selection)
 Čaj na Zamaleku (Tea Time in Zamalek), short stories, Geopoetika, Belgrade 2002, . 
 Fabrika hartije (Paper Factory), short stories, Geopoetika, Belgrade 2003, .
 Uspavanka za Lalu (Lullaby for Lala), novel, Geopoetika, Belgrade 2004, . 
 Poljupci, sećanja i razgovori (Kisses, Memories and Conversations), novel, Geopoetika, Belgrade 2006, .
 Život u raju  (Life in Heaven), short stories, Samizdat B92, Belgrade 2016, .

Filmography (selection)

Film
 Ruski umetnički eksperiment (The Russian Artistic Experiment), Television film (1982)
 Šumanović – Komedija umetnika (Šumanović – Comedy of an Artist), Television film (1987)
#SamoKažem (#JustSaying), co-author, Web series (2013)
 Put u budućnost (Way to the Future), Documentary film series, RTS (2017)

Video advertisement
Biljana Srbljanović, Skakavci, Trailer of Yugoslav Drama Theatre (2005)
 Telekom Srbija, BizNet, MTS (2007)
 Telekom Srbija, MTS – Imate prijatelje!, Ensemble Kolo (2007)
 Creative Center for Tourism, Art and Culture, Jedinstvena zemlja nadomak nas... (The unique country near us...), Kovačica (2016)
RTS, Rio 2016 – Team Serbia (PTCreative Belgrade)
Idea, Za koga ti kuvaš?

Music video
 Laibach, Across The Universe (1989)
 Kanda, Kodža i Nebojša, Kafane i rokenrol (2010)
 Nina, Čaroban, Song of the Eurovision Song Contest 2011
 Grupa Regina, Kalimero (2014)

References

1956 births
Living people
Serbian artists
Serbian television directors
Serbian male short story writers
Serbian short story writers
University of Belgrade Faculty of Dramatic Arts alumni